The Ladoga Canal is a historical water transport route, now situated in Leningrad Oblast, linking the Neva and the Svir River so as to bypass the stormy waters of Lake Ladoga which lies immediately to the northwest.

History
The Ladoga Canal was one of the first major canals constructed in Russia. It was one of the projects of Peter the Great, who ordered its construction in 1718. Rapid economic development in Russia required a significant expansion of routes, especially waterways. One part of the Vyshny Volochyok Waterway (1709) linking the Volga river to the Baltic Sea, passed through Lake Ladoga. The Ladoga section of the route was one of the most difficult and dangerous because the lake is prone to winds and storms which destroyed hundreds of cargo ships.

Peter the Great decided to avoid the navigation in the huge and stormy lake by building a bypass canal. The construction started in 1719.  Prince Menshikov put his friend General Skornyakov-Pisarev in charge of the project, but he eventually had to step down amid charges of incompetence, carelessness, and procrastination. In autumn 1723 the Tsar personally inspected the construction site and was not satisfied with the pace of construction; so much so that he ordered the arrest of Skornyakov-Pisarev and his German specialists. The task of completing the canal was taken from private hands and entrusted to Burkhard Christoph von Münnich who liberally utilized soldier labour.

This greatly accelerated work, as the completed section was used to deliver supplies to the construction site. The locks were constructed at Shlisselburg and Novaya Ladoga to maintain the depth needed for navigation. Construction of the canal was completed on October 22, 1730, and in spring 1731 the first boats were able to sail along the canal between the Volkhov River and the Neva River (Ladoga Canal proper).

It turned out that the canal had a depth of less than one metre, considerably less than envisioned by Peter I. This was a major disappointment to the government. Although the canal was one of the largest hydroengineering facilities in 18th-century Europe, it was still too shallow to maintain a considerable traffic. Catherine the Great decided to expand the canal by building another section between the Volkhov and Syas Rivers. This project was implemented between 1765 and 1802 (so-called Syas Canal). The third part of the Ladoga Canal, connecting the Syas and the Svir, was built over the years 1802 to 1810 (so-called Svir Canal). 

In the course of the 19th century, the Ladoga Canal was used by about 15,000 vessels and 10,000 rafts heading towards St. Petersburg every year, but silted up so badly that Alexander II's government decided that it was more practicable to build a new canal instead of repairing the old facilities. The New Ladoga Canal was built closer to Lake Ladoga between 1866 and 1883.  The Old Ladoga Canal was overgrown with grass and had become disused by 1940. The New Ladoga Canal is still used by small boats.

References
Inline

General
Гершельман Э.Ф. "Исторический очерк внутренних водных сообщений". St. Petersburg, 1892.
Горелов В. "Речные каналы России". Leningrad-Moscow: Rechizdat, 1953.

External links

History of Ladoga and Shlisselburg
Волхов и южный берег Ладоги.
Староладожский и Новоладожский каналы
ПЕРВЫЕ ИСКУССТВЕННЫЕ ВОДНЫЕ ПУТИ. ВЫШНЕВОЛОЦКАЯ СИСТЕМА
город ШЛИССЕЛЬБУРГ 3
map on www.clubneva.ru
Маршрут № 17: Река Свирь и Староладожские каналы от города Лодейное Поле до города Новая Ладога // Плечко Л.А. Водные маршруты Ленинградской области. Leningrad, 1987.

Canals in Russia
Buildings and structures in Leningrad Oblast
Transport in Leningrad Oblast
Canals opened in 1730
Canals opened in 1810
Canals opened in 1883
1730 establishments in the Russian Empire
Cultural heritage monuments in Leningrad Oblast